Mary Cook may refer to:

People 
Dame Mary Cook (1863–1950), wife of Australian Prime Minister Sir Joseph Cook
Mary N. Cook (born 1951), American religious leader of the Young Women in the LDS Church
Mary Pilcher-Cook (born 1954), American politician, member of the Kansas Senate
Mary Virginia Cook Parrish (1862–1945), American educator, public speaker, and Black Baptist women's leader
Mary Alexander Cook (1902–1981), museum curator and expert on Cape Dutch architecture
Mary Curnock Cook (born 1958), British academic administrator
Mary Ellen Cook (born 1980), American film star Mary Carey who ran for California governor in 2003

Other 
Mary Cook, original name of American screw steamer 
Mary L. Cook Public Library in Waynesville, Ohio

Cook, Mary